Madhi-Madhi, also known as Muthimuthi or Madi Madi, is an Indigenous Australian language spoken by the Muthi Muthi Aboriginal people of New South Wales.

Australian Institute of Aboriginal and Torres Strait Islander Studies (AIATSIS) AUSTLANG Code: D8 and reference name: Mutti Mutti / Muthi Muthi, also known as Madhi Madhi, Madi Madi, Bakiin, Mataua, Matimati, Matthee matthee, Moorta Moorta, Mudhi Mudhi, Muthimuthi, Muti muti, Muttee Muttee, Madimadi, Mutte Mutte, Madi madi.

Luise Hercus published in 1989 a substantial amount of Madhi Madhi language data recorded from Jack Long whom she described as "the last Madimadi man".

References

Further reading 

Kulin languages